Qi (齊/齐, also commonly written as Ch’i in Wade–Giles, and Chai in Cantonese) is Chinese surname originated from the Qi (state) (齊/齐). In 2013 it was the 113th most common name, shared by 1,760,000 people or 0.130% of the population, with the province with the most being Hebei. It is the 87th name on the Hundred Family Surnames poem.

Notable people
Qi Baishi, painter in the 20th century
Chyi Yu, singer
Chyi Chin, singer
Qi Xin, mother of Xi Jinping
Chi Po-lin, documentary filmmaker
Qi Ying (齊映) (748 – 795), formally Baron Zhong of Hejian (河間忠男), was an official of the  Tang Dynasty
Qi Kerang (齊克讓) was a general of the Tang Dynasty, who was part of Tang's resistance against the major agrarian rebel Huang Chao
Qi Xieyuan, Chinese warlord
Qi Xueting (齐雪婷; born 1986) is a Chinese ice hockey player 
Qi Yaolin (齊耀琳) (1863 – ?) was a Chinese politician of the late Qing Dynasty and early period of the Republic of China. He was born in Jilin
Qi Yaoshan (齊耀珊; 1865 - 1954), courtesy name Zhaoyan, was a statesman and government official in the Qing dynasty and Republic of China
Qi Kang (architect), Southeast University. Qi's family is originally from Tiantai County, Zhejiang Province, China. Qi's family is descendant Qi Zhaonan (齊召南), a notable Chinese
Qi Kang (official), (齊抗; 740 – 804), courtesy name Xiaju (遐舉), was an official of the Chinese dynasty Tang
Chai Po Wa (齊寶華) or Qi Baohua is a table tennis player from Hong Kong
Qi Guangpu (齐广璞; born 1990) is a Chinese aerial skier 
Pamelyn Chee (Chinese: 齐騛) a Singaporean actress.

References

Surnames